Asterix is a horizontal-scrolling beat'em up arcade game released in 1992 by Konami. It is based on the French comic series Asterix and Obelix. The player fights as either Asterix the Gaul or his best friend, Obelix, as they take on the 'might' of the oppressive Roman Empire. Asterix includes a variety of humorous fighting moves, which are demonstrated in the game's attract mode. The artwork and feel of Asterix remains true to its French source material, and the game's many humorous touches (such as the way defeated Legionnaires crawl away) will be instantly familiar to fans of the comic-book and cartoon series. Bonus levels - such as the chariot race that awaits at the end of the first level - introduce different gameplay elements to provide a break from the fighting.
Despite this game being developed by a Japanese company, all text in the game is either in English or French.

Characters

There are two characters the player can choose in this game. The first is small and agile Asterix and the second one is big, strong Obelix carrying a stone on his back at the level beginning. Those two characters have their own unique animations allowing them to defeat enemies in many different ways.
Although Obelix is much stronger within the comic books stories, the powers of both characters in game are equal.

The game can be completed using standard grips such as punch, kick, clap..etc. or using a special powerful attack “fast rotating arm”. This special ability is done by holding the attack button for a short while until the character's face turn red. After that the player must walk to an enemy and release the button. The enemy in this moment will fly up and after a short while drops down. This special attack is the only way to defeat the strongest bosses in game.

After an enemy has been beaten enough to fall to the ground, he can be picked up for further abuse, depending on the character. For example, Asterix can pick up a soldier and twirl him above his head, Obelix instead smashes him to the ground to the left and right of his. Both characters' attacks knock down other enemies hit by the unhappy soldier they hold in their arms during the attack.

At points during stages, Dogmatix will bring out either a vial of Magic Potion for Asterix, or a roast boar for Obelix. Collecting these will grant brief invincibility, allowing Asterix and Obelix to rush about the screen to quickly clear away enemies.

Reception

References

External links
 Asterix at Arcade History
 

1992 video games
Arcade video games
Arcade-only video games
Cooperative video games
Konami beat 'em ups
Multiplayer and single-player video games
Side-scrolling beat 'em ups
Video games based on Asterix
Video games developed in Japan
Video games scored by Junya Nakano
Video games scored by Michiru Yamane
Video games set in Egypt
Video games set in Europe
Video games set in France
Video games set in India
Video games set in Rome
Video games set in Spain
Video games set in the 1st century BC
Video games set in the Roman Empire
Video games set in the United Kingdom